Synaxaire Arabe-Jacobite is a volume containing biographies of several saints. These include:

Abadios, a martyr of the Christian church. He was born at Bilgai in Egypt. He was a native soldier of the army who professed his faith in Jesus Christ during the reign of Diocletian at Khalakhis. He was martyred by being thrown into a rock. His feast day is on January 20.

Abakuh (also known as Apa Kauh), another martyr of the Christian church. He was born at Bamujeh in the Al Fayyum area of Egypt. He was a zealous Christian who was martyred for his Christianity with eight companions. His feast day is January 23. He is referenced in the Synaxaire Arabe-Jacobite.

References

Christian hagiography